The 2022 Campeonato Brasileiro de Futebol Feminino Série A2 (officially the Brasileirão Feminino Binance A-2 2022 for sponsorship reasons) was the 6th season of the Campeonato Brasileiro de Futebol Feminino Série A2, the second level of women's football in Brazil. The tournament was organized by CBF. It started on 11 June and ended on 17 September 2022.

Sixteen teams competed in the tournament. Twelve returning from the 2021 Série A2 and four relegated from the 2021 Série A1 (Bahia, Botafogo, Minas/ICESP and Napoli). As Napoli were disbanded, they were replaced by CEFAMA

The four semi-finalists, Athletico Paranaense, Bahia, Ceará and Real Ariquemes, were promoted to the 2023 Série A1, while Aliança/Goiás, CEFAMA, Iranduba and Vasco da Gama were relegated to the 2023 Série A3.

Tied 2–2 on aggregate, Ceará defeated Athletico Paranaense 3–1 on penalties in the finals to win their first title.

Format
In the group stage, the 16 teams were divided into four groups of four organized regionally. Top two teams qualified for the quarter-finals. From the quarter-finals on the competition was played as a knock-out tournament with each round contested over two legs.

Teams

Number of teams by state

Stadiums and locations

Group stage
In the group stage, each group was played on a home-and-away round-robin basis. The teams were ranked according to points (3 points for a win, 1 point for a draw, and 0 points for a loss). If tied on points, the following criteria would be used to determine the ranking: 1. Wins; 2. Goal difference; 3. Goals scored; 4. Fewest red cards; 5. Fewest yellow cards; 6. Draw in the headquarters of the Brazilian Football Confederation (Regulations Article 15).

The top two teams qualified for the quarter-finals, while the four teams with the lowest number of points, regardless of the group, were relegated to the 2023 Série A3.

Group A

Group B

Group C

Group D

Final stages
The final stages were played on a home-and-away two-legged basis. If tied on aggregate, the away goals rule would not be used, extra time would not be played, and the penalty shoot-out would be used to determine the winners (Regulations Article 16). For the semi-finals and finals, the best-overall-performance team hosted the second leg.

The four quarter-finals winners were promoted to 2023 Série A1.

Quarter-finals
The matches were played from 6 to 13 August 2022.

Matches

|}

Semi-finals
The matches were played from 20 to 27 August 2022.

Matches

|}

Finals
The matches were played on 10 and 17 September 2022.

Matches

|}

Top goalscorers

References

Women's football leagues in Brazil
2022 in Brazilian football